Lt Col John David Hills MC* (18951975) was a British soldier. He served with the Leicestershire Regiment during the First World War—his letters have been published online. During the war he was awarded an MC and bar. After the war he read history at Oxford and worked as a teacher; he was master at Eton from 1921 to 1939, and headmaster of Bradfield College from 1940–1955.

He married Lady Rosemary Baring, elder daughter of Rowland Baring, 2nd Earl of Cromer in 1932. They had two daughters and one son:

 Jean Adini Hills (1933–2005), married Brig. Hon. Henry Ernest Christopher Willoughby (div. 1990)
 Margaret Ruby Hills (born 1934), married Michael Giles Neish Walker CBE 
 Colonel John Evelyn Hills (1939–2009)

References 

1895 births
1975 deaths
British Army personnel of World War I